This is a recap of the 2002–03 season for the Professional Bowlers Association (PBA) Tour.  It was the tour's 44th season and consisted of 22 events.

Walter Ray Williams, Jr. won his sixth PBA Player of the Year award, tying Earl Anthony for the most all time. He won three titles on the season, including major victories at the 60th U.S. Open and PBA World Championship, while collecting a PBA record $419,700. This record would stand until 2021, when it was surpassed by Kyle Troup.

Bryon Smith won his first PBA title at the ABC Masters. Jason Couch became just the second three-time winner of the Tournament of Champions (joining Mike Durbin), as well as the only player to win three consecutive TOC events.

Eugene McCune's win at the PBA Banquet Classic marked the third time (after Dick & Pete Weber and Don and Jimmy Johnson) that a father-and-son combination had each won PBA titles. Eugene's father is PBA Hall of Famer Don McCune, who won eight titles in his career.

At the GEICO Earl Anthony Classic in Tacoma, Washington, Norm Duke rolled the PBA's 15th televised 300 game.

Tournament schedule

References

External links
2002–03 Season Schedule

Professional Bowlers Association seasons
2002 in bowling
2003 in bowling